Parliamentary elections were held in the Federated States of Micronesia on 6 March 2001. As there were no political parties, all 18 candidates ran as independents. Four candidates were elected unopposed.

Electoral system
At the time of the election, Congress consisted of 14 members, of which 10 were elected for two-year terms and four elected for four-year terms. The 2001 elections were for the ten two-year seats.

Results

Elected members

References

Elections in the Federated States of Micronesia
Micronesia
Parliamentary election
Non-partisan elections
March 2001 events in Oceania